Stuart Watkins (born 5 June 1941) was a Welsh international rugby union wing who played club rugby for Newport and Cardiff.

Watkins began his rugby career at Cross Keys before switching to Newport in 1963, staying with the club for the majority of his career. In 1970, in a dispute about training, Watkins left Newport to join rival club Cardiff.

International career 
Watkins made his international debut for Wales against Scotland on 1 February 1964. Played at the Cardiff Arms Park, it was Scotland's only defeat of the season and would be the key game in Wales winning the championship that year. Watkins would represent his country on 26 occasions, and his most notable game came against France on 26 March 1966. It was the final game of the tournament and Wales were trailing by 8 points to a team they had beaten only once in the last eight encounters. Keith Bradshaw had dragged Wales back into the game with two penalty goals when Watkins intercepted a French three quarter movement on his own 25 yard line. He raced 75 yards down the right touch line to score a memorable try that not only gave Wales the match but also the championship.

In 1966, Watkins was selected to play for the British Lions in their tour of New Zealand and Australia. Watkins would play in three of the tests.

International games played
Wales
 1966
 1965, 1966, 1967, 1968, 1969, 1970
 1964, 1965, 1966, 1967, 1969
 1964, 1965, 1966, 1967, 1969, 1970
 1967, 1969
 1964, 1965, 1966, 1967, 1968, 1969

British Lions
Australia 1966
New Zealand 1966, 1966

Bibliography

References 

Welsh rugby union players
Wales international rugby union players
Rugby union players from Newport, Wales
1941 births
Newport HSOB RFC players
Newport RFC players
Cardiff RFC players
British & Irish Lions rugby union players from Wales
Barbarian F.C. players
Cross Keys RFC players
Living people
Rugby union wings